James Arthur Donald Carolane (10 January 1928 – 2 October 2001) was an Australian sailor. He competed in the Dragon event at the 1956 Summer Olympics.

References

External links
 

1928 births
Australian male sailors (sport)
Olympic sailors of Australia
Sailors at the 1956 Summer Olympics – Dragon
Place of birth missing
2001 deaths
20th-century Australian people